The 1924 United States presidential election in Tennessee took place on November 4, 1924, as part of the 1924 United States presidential election. Tennessee voters chose 12 representatives, or electors, to the Electoral College, who voted for president and vice president.

Background
For over a century after the Civil War, Tennessee was divided according to political loyalties established in that war. Unionist regions covering almost all of East Tennessee, Kentucky Pennyroyal-allied Macon County, and the five West Tennessee Highland Rim counties of Carroll, Henderson, McNairy, Hardin and Wayne voted Republican – generally by landslide margins – as they saw the Democratic Party as the “war party” who had forced them into a war they did not wish to fight. Contrariwise, the rest of Middle and West Tennessee who had supported and driven the state's secession was equally fiercely Democratic as it associated the Republicans with Reconstruction. After the disfranchisement of the state's African-American population by a poll tax was largely complete in the 1890s, the Democratic Party was certain of winning statewide elections if united, although unlike the Deep South Republicans would almost always gain thirty to forty percent of the statewide vote from mountain and Highland Rim support. When the Democratic Party was bitterly divided, the Republicans did win the governorship in 1910 and 1912, but did not gain at other levels.

The 1920 election saw a significant but not radical change, whereby by moving into a small number of traditionally Democratic areas in Middle Tennessee and expanding turnout due to the Nineteenth Amendment and powerful isolationist sentiment, the Republican Party was able to capture Tennessee's presidential electoral votes and win the governorship and take three congressional seats in addition to the rock-ribbed GOP First and Second Districts. In 1922, with the ebbing of isolationist sympathy and a consequent decline in turnout, the Democratic Party regained the three seats lost in 1920 and also regained Tennessee's governorship under Austin Peay, later to become notorious for attempting to prohibit the teaching of evolution.

During the deeply divided Democratic presidential primaries and 1924 Democratic National Convention, Governor Peay was Tennessee's main representative Despite Tennessee's strong prohibitionist leanings and “Bible Belt” anti-Catholicism, it was thought popular Catholic New York Governor Al Smith would have to carry the state at this convention to win the Democratic nomination. However, in May, Tennessee went to Smith's rival William Gibbs McAdoo, who represented the rural, southern, historically secessionist and prohibitionist wing of the party.

Ultimately neither Smith nor McAdoo could prove acceptable to all Democratic delegates and the nomination went to a compromise candidate in Wall Street lawyer John W. Davis of West Virginia. Although West Virginia was a border state whose limited African-American population had not been disenfranchised as in all former Confederate States, Davis did share the extreme social conservatism of Southern Democrats of his era. He supported poll taxes, opposed women's suffrage, and believed in strictly limited government with no expansion in nonmilitary fields. At the same time a progressive third-party run was predicted as early as winter 1923–24, and ultimately Wisconsin Senator Robert M. La Follette Sr. would be nominated by the “Committee for Progressive Political Action”.

Vote
The possibility of large La Follette votes in the Midwest and West tying up the Electoral College led Coolidge and Davis to give major priority to Tennessee and the border states – where La Follette generally had little appeal – in the early fall campaigns. In polling from the beginning of October, Tennessee was without representation, but at the end of that month it was rated as doubtful between Coolidge and Davis, although during the third week of that month Davis himself had said he would carry the state by thirty to fifty thousand votes.

At the beginning of November a drift to Coolidge was predicted by the New York Times, though Davis was still expected to carry the state by fewer than twenty thousand votes. As it proved, Davis won Tennessee by slightly more than the New York Times expected – with a twenty-eight-thousand vote plurality. Although La Follette would relegate Davis to third in twelve states and carry his home state of Wisconsin, he had very little appeal amongst Tennessee's poll-tax-restricted electorate, with the exception of small nitrate-mining communities in and around Grundy County where he even ran second ahead of Coolidge. It was predicted in the latest polls that La Follette would gain less than ten percent of Tennessee's ballots, and in the end he finished with only 3.55%, making Tennessee La Follette's fourth-weakest state nationwide.

, this is the last occasion a Democrat has won Tennessee without winning the presidency.

Results

Results by county

Notes

References 

1924 Tennessee elections
Tennessee
1924